Haplognathiidae is a family of worms belonging to the order Filospermoidea.

Genera:
 Haplognathia Sterrer, 1970

References

Gnathostomulida
Platyzoa families